Identifying Features is a 2020 Mexican-Spanish drama film that premiered at the Sundance Film Festival and won the Audience Award: World Cinema Dramatic and the World Cinema Dramatic Special Jury Award for Best Screenplay. It was written and directed by Fernanda Veladez. The co-writer is Astrid Rondero. It is about the many immigrants who often go missing or die on their journeys. Most of the main characters are mothers trying to find their children.

Reception
The website's critics consensus reads: "A slow-burning descent into desperation, Identifying Features uses one shattered family's ordeal to offer a harrowing look at the immigrant experience." According to Metacritic, which sampled 15 critics and calculated a weighted average score of 85 out of 100, the film received "universal acclaim".

Accolades

Notes

References

External links 
 

2020 drama films
Mexican drama films
Spanish drama films
2020s Spanish-language films
Sundance Film Festival award winners
Films about immigration to the United States
2020s Mexican films
2020s Spanish films